Rami Zur (born February 3, 1977) is an American sprint canoer who has competed since the late 1990s for Israel and later for the United States.

He competed for Israel at the 2000 Summer Olympics and for the United States at the 2004 and 2008 Olympics. In all competitions he was eliminated in the semifinals.  He was born in Berkeley, California and is Jewish on his biological mother's side; he was later adopted and raised by an Israeli Jewish couple.

Zur is currently retired and coaches his wife Krisztina Fazekas Zur, who is an Olympic champion canoeist herself.

References

External links
 

1977 births
American male canoeists
Canoeists at the 2000 Summer Olympics
Canoeists at the 2004 Summer Olympics
Canoeists at the 2008 Summer Olympics
Israeli male canoeists
Living people
Olympic canoeists of Israel
Olympic canoeists of the United States
Sportspeople from Berkeley, California
Jewish American sportspeople
Israeli Jews
Pan American Games bronze medalists for the United States
Pan American Games medalists in canoeing
Canoeists at the 2003 Pan American Games
Medalists at the 2003 Pan American Games
21st-century American Jews